Plesiophrictus tenuipes, is a species of spider of the genus Plesiophrictus. It is endemic to Sri Lanka.

See also
 List of Theraphosidae species

References

External links
A new species of the genus Plesiophrictus (Araneae: Theraphosidae: Ischnocolinae) from Western Ghats, India

Theraphosidae
Endemic fauna of Sri Lanka
Spiders of Asia
Spiders described in 1899